Launched is the second album from German hardcore punk band, Beatsteaks. It was released in March, 2000 on Epitaph Records and follows the band's debut release 48/49 in 1997 on XNO Records. The album contains an interesting half acoustic cover version of a song by heavy metal band, Manowar, "Kings of Metal". The band stayed with Epitaph Records for their next release, Living Targets, in 2002.

Track listing
All songs written by Beatsteaks unless stated otherwise
"Panic"				– 2:38
"We Have to Figure It Out Tonight"	– 1:36
"Shut Up Stand Up"			– 2:44
"Shiny Shoes"				– 2:59
"2 O'Clock"				– 2:58
"Happy Now?"				– 3:51
"Mietzi's Song"			– 2:44
"Excited"				– 1:24
"...And Wait"				– 3:45
"Filter"				– 2:20
"Fake"					– 3:14
"Go"					– 2:09
"Kings of Metal" (Joey DeMaio)	– 4:35
"Schluß mit Rock 'n' Roll"		– 12:54
Track 14 is only actually 3:12 – the rest of the track starts at 4:15 and is taken from rehearsals

Credits
Arnim Teutoburg-Weiß	–	vocals, guitar
Peter Baumann	–	guitar
Bernd Kurtzke	–	guitar
Alexander Roßwaag	–	bass
Thomas Götz	–	drums
 El Köfte and Holly – guest musicians on "Mietzi's Song" and "Schluß mit Rock 'n' Roll"
 Recorded in 1999 at K4 (Elektro Automatisch), Berlin, Germany
 Produced and engineered by Uwe Sabirowsky
 Co-produced by Beatsteaks
 Mixed at Nucleus Studio, Berlin, Germany
 Mastered by Howie Weinberg at Masterdisk, New York City, USA

External links
Beatsteaks official website
Epitaph Records album page
Launched Lyrics

2000 albums
Beatsteaks albums
Epitaph Records albums